is a Japanese volleyball player who played for Kurobe AquaFairies. She served as the captain of the team from 2009.

Profiles
The former name is Yuki Sugawara.
Her younger sister is the same team, Kurobe AquaFairies.
She can play at any positions but setter.

Clubs
Kasukabe Kyoei High School → Hisamitsu Springs (2000–2002) → Mobara Arcas (2002–2006) → Hitachi Sawa Rivale (2006–2008) → Kurobe AquaFairies (2008-2012)

National team
 2008 - 1st AVC Women's Cup

References

External links
JVA Biography
Kurobe Aquafairies Officialwebsite

1981 births
Living people
Japanese women's volleyball players